Xiuwuxi (West) railway station is a station on Zhengzhou–Jiaozuo intercity railway in Xiuwu County, Jiaozuo, Henan, China.

Future development
The station is planned to be the terminus of the proposed spur line of Zhengzhou–Jiaozuo intercity railway towards Yuntaishan.

References

Railway stations in Henan
Stations on the Zhengzhou–Jiaozuo intercity railway
Railway stations in China opened in 2015